Aksu Hanttu (born ) is a musician, record producer and sound engineer from Lahti, Finland. He plays the drums in the metal band Entwine and vocals and drums in the group Tuoni. Hanttu is also involved with Finnvox Studios in Helsinki, which has worked with artists such as Nightwish, Reflexion, Soulrelic and the Belarusian 2009 Eurovision Song Contest entry Petr Elfimov. He mixed the album, Fuel for the Fire by Finnish Idols winner, Ari Koivunen. He was a co-writer on Julma Satu, the debut album of Villieläin and also provided backing vocals on most of the tracks, as well as helping to produce it at Wave Sound Studios in Aatolike.

He is influenced by Rammstein, Mokoma and Kiss and uses the following equipment in his drum set: Yamaha drums, Zildjain cymbals and Pro-mark drumsticks. He has been playing the drums since 1991, but did not gain fame until 1995.

References 

1979 births
Finnish male musicians
Living people
People from Lahti